The 2013 Western Michigan Broncos football team represented Western Michigan University (WMU) in the 2013 NCAA Division I FBS football season. They were led by first-year head coach P. J. Fleck and played their home games at Waldo Stadium as a member of the West Division of the Mid-American Conference (MAC). In 2013, the Broncos finished at 1–11 (1–7 MAC), and last place in the MAC West division.

Off-season
WMU was picked to finish fifth in the West division by members of the media.

The Broncos gained national notoriety during the offseason from Fleck, the youngest head coach in the NCAA Football Bowl Subdivision. Fleck introduced the "Row The Boat" theme, focusing on a group of people working together to reach a common goal. He participated in a "polar plunge" to raise money for Special Olympics and created a Harlem Shake video.

Holly Anderson of Sports Illustrated and Grantland chose WMU as the "MAC team you should root for". Deadspin posted an article commenting on a YouTube video WMU produced introducing new traditions that were planned for Broncos home games.

Season
WMU started the season with eight consecutive losses before winning their first game. They fell to Michigan State University and Football Championship Subdivision (FCS) member Nicholls State University. Nicholls had won two games the previous two seasons. Both their wins came against National Association of Intercollegiate Athletics (NAIA) member Evangel College.

WMU finished the non-conference portion of the schedule losing to No. 17 Northwestern followed by a 59–3 blowout loss to Iowa. The Broncos then lost their first four MAC games.

Western Michigan defeated Massachusetts 31–30 in week nine of the season after Massachusetts failed to convert a two-point conversion with 22 seconds left in the game that would have given the Minutemen the lead.

The Broncos failed to win consecutive games losing to Eastern Michigan (EMU) 35–32 the following week in overtime. The loss occurred a day after EMU fired head coach Ron English. The loss also eliminated WMU from winning the Michigan MAC Trophy.

Schedule

Awards

Donald Celiscar
Junior defensive back Donald Celiscar was named the MAC West Division Defensive Player of the Week for Week 1. He had 10 tackles and two pass breakups in WMU's 26–13 loss to Michigan State.

Corey Davis
Freshman wide receiver Corey Davis was named to the Fred Biletnikoff Award watchlist after the third week of the season. Through five games, Davis has 16 receptions for 335 yards and two touchdowns.

Andrew Haldeman
Sophomore placekicker Andrew Haldeman was named the MAC West Division Special Teams Player of the Week for Week 9. Haldeman made a 36-yard field goal along with four extra points in the Broncos first win of the season, a 31–30 victory over Massachusetts.

J. Schroeder
Sophomore punter J. Schroeder received an honorable mention from the College Football Performance Awards for Week 1. He punted the ball 11 times (third most in the nation for the week) and had the 11th longest punt in the nation for the week. Schroeder was named 1 of 85 candidates for the 2013 Ray Guy Award.

References

Western Michigan
Western Michigan Broncos football seasons
Western Michigan Broncos football